Wing River may refer to:

Wing River (Leaf River tributary), in Minnesota, United States
Wing River (Rapid River tributary), in Minnesota, United States
Wing River Township, Wadena County, Minnesota, United States